Beltrán de la Cueva y Alfonso de Mercado, 1st Duke of Alburquerque (c. 1443 – 1 November 1492) was a Spanish nobleman who is said to have fathered Joanna, the daughter of Henry IV of Castile's wife Joan of Portugal. His alleged daughter, called "la Beltraneja", was deprived of the crown of Castile because of the uncertainty regarding her parentage.

Early life
Henry IV, in his second year as king, travelled to Úbeda and stayed with Beltrán's father, Diego Fernández de la Cueva, 1st Viscount of Huelma. When he left this house, he took Diego's second oldest son, Beltrán, with him to stay at Court to show his gratitude to Diego. (Diego offered Beltrán after Enrique asked for Diego's oldest son, whom Diego wanted to keep close by).

He married as his first wife Teresa de Molina de Quesada, of Úbeda, daughter of Francisco Cazorla de Quesada and wife Guiomar Mayor de Molina y Vera, without issue.

Beltrán soon became the King's favourite and married Cardinal Mendoza's niece, Doña Mencía Hurtado de Mendoza y Luna, daughter of Diego Hurtado de Mendoza, 1st Duke of the Infantado, by whom he had a son Francisco Fernández de la Cueva.

Royal affairs
Beltrán de la Cueva is, however, best known for allegedly having an affair with Henry's second wife, Joan of Portugal. It was rumoured that Henry's only child, Joanna was fathered by Beltrán and not by the King himself, who may have been impotent. This rumour led to a four-year War of the Castilian Succession, which was won by Isabella I, Henry's half-sister. It is unlikely that an agreement as to Joanna's probable paternity will ever be reached by historians, as there is not enough evidence to support either possible father with certainty. Most of the extant contemporary sources about Henry's potency are suspect, as the royal chronicles of his reign were either written or revised under the influence of Isabella, whose personal interest in the succession caused her to take great pains to insist on Joanna's illegitimacy. Much of Isabella's attention to Henry, in fact, was spent on harming his reputation in order to cement the legitimacy of her own reign. The question of Joanna's paternity has, as a result, fascinated historians for centuries: if Joanna was not in fact Beltran's daughter, and was actually legitimate, Isabella's tremendously influential reign would have been an illegal usurpation.

Royal chronicler Alfonso de Palencia, known for his particularly venomous attitude toward Henry, made many allusions in his writings that can be interpreted as accusations concerning Beltran's sexuality. Palencia and other avid anti-Henryites often accused the two of pursuing a homosexual relationship, though it is not clear to what extent these accusations were based on fact, or whether they were a form of anti-Henry, pro-rebellion, pro-Isabelline propaganda.

Height of Power
Beltran was among Henry IV's most-popular favourites; throughout his time in court, Henry showered him with gifts—land, money, offices—of such magnitude that many nobles of higher background took offense. He was a Great-Master of the Order of Santiago and Chamberlain-Major. In 1462, the King granted him the title of 1st Count of Ledesma. In 1463, Beltrán was removed from Court and received as compensation the title of Duke of Alburquerque and Grandee of Spain by mercy of King Henry IV at Segovia, Letter of 16 November or 26 November 1464. He was also created in 1464 1st Lord of Cuéllar, Roa, Atienza, Torregalindo, Codecera, etc.

In 1467, he fought in the Second Battle of Olmedo against the rebels supporting Alfonso of Castile, Prince of Asturias. As a reward, he was also created 1st Count of Huelma by Decree of the same King on August 20, 1474 (who would die later in December). This was later confirmed by Queen Isabella I and King Ferdinand V on April 20, 1475; in the War of the Castilian Succession, Beltran supported the Catholic Monarchs against his presumed daughter Joan. He also distinguished himself in the conquest of Granada along with his son Don Francisco.

Later life
A widower in 1474, he married in 1479 as her second husband Dona María Fernández de Velasco y Ponce de Leon, daughter of the Constable of Castile, Don Pedro Fernández de Velasco and Isabel Ponce de Leon y Baenza.  This marriage produced two sons.  The first, Don Cristóbal de la Cueva y Velasco, was born in Cuéllar.  He married Leonor de Velasco y Carrillo de Córdoba, 3rd Countess of Siruela, who died in 1529, and had issue.  The second son, Don Antonio de la Cueva y Velasco, 1st Lord of La Adrada, married Elvira de Ayala and had issue.

He also had a bastard son named Manuel Beltrão, who went to Portugal and married Francisca da Mota, descendants of the Beltrão family.

Beltrán de la Cueva died in 1492 and was buried at the Convent of San Francisco de Cuéllar.

Additional information

See also

Henry IV of Castile
Joan of Portugal
Joanna La Beltraneja
Isabella I of Castile
Alfonso of Castile, Prince of Asturias
War of the Castilian Succession

Notes

Sources

 John Browne Ayes, Biogeographical Genealogist: http://www.blogster.com/ayesart/de-la-cueva-genealogy-corrected-and-continued

 

1443 births
1492 deaths
101
Counts of Ledesma
Counts of Huelma
Knights of Santiago
People from Úbeda
Spanish royal favourites